RMS or SS Empress of China may refer to one of these Canadian Pacific Steamship Company ocean liners:

 , a  ship launched from Barrow, England in 1891 as one of the first three ships Canadian Pacific ordered in creating the White Empress fleet; scrapped in 1912.
 , briefly named Empress of China in 1921; originally the  Norddeutscher Lloyd ship SS Prinz Friedrich Wilhelm launched in 1907; renamed Empress of India; later renamed Montlaurier,  Monteith, and Montnairn before being scrapped in 1929.
 , briefly named Empress of China in 1921; originally the  Hamburg-America Line ship SS Tirpitz launched in 1913; renamed Empress of Australia in 1922; scrapped in 1952.

Ship names